The World Group Play-offs were the main play-offs of 2007 Davis Cup. Winners advanced to the World Group, and loser were relegated in the Zonal Regions I.

Teams
Bold indicates team has qualified for the 2008 Davis Cup World Group.

 From World Group

 From Americas Group I

 From Asia/Oceania Group I

 From Europe/Africa Group I

Results

Seeded teams
 
 
 
 
 
 
 
 

Unseeded teams

 
 
 
 
 
  
 
 

 ,  and  will remain in Zonal Group I in 2008.

Playoff results

Serbia vs. Australia

Austria vs. Brazil

Peru vs. Belarus

Israel vs. Chile

Great Britain vs. Croatia

Czech Republic vs. Switzerland

Japan vs. Romania

Slovakia vs. South Korea

References

World Group Play-offs